Ihor Gavrilovich Chumachenko (born 26 October 1976) is a Belarusian professional football coach and former player. Besides Belarus, he has played in Ukraine.

Coaching career
On 15 January 2019, Chumachenko became coach of the FC Torpedo Minsk's reserve team.

Honours
Dnepr-Transmash Mogilev
Belarusian Premier League champion: 1998

BATE Borisov
Belarusian Premier League champion: 2002

Irtysh Pavlodar
Kazakhstan Premier League champion: 2003

References

External links
 Profile at Neman website
 Profile at ffu.org.ua
 
 

1976 births
Living people
Ukrainian footballers
Ukrainian expatriate footballers
Expatriate footballers in Belarus
Belarusian footballers
Belarusian expatriate footballers
Expatriate footballers in Kazakhstan
Belarusian Premier League players
FC Prometei Dniprodzerzhynsk players
FC Chornomorets Odesa players
FC Dinamo Minsk players
FC BATE Borisov players
FC Irtysh Pavlodar players
FC Neman Grodno players
FC Dnepr Mogilev players
FC Naftan Novopolotsk players
Belarusian people of Ukrainian descent
FC Rechitsa-2014 players
FC DSK Gomel players
FC Gorodeya players
FC Oleksandriya players
Association football midfielders
Belarusian football managers
FC Dnepr Mogilev managers
FC Orsha managers
Sportspeople from Odesa Oblast